Taj Malik (born 1975) is an Afghan cricketer. He is a right-handed batsman and leg break bowler who played for Afghanistan. He is credited as one of the most influential persons in Afghan cricket, and was their first national coach. He was also chairman of the Afghanistan National Cricket Academy, leading its domestic competitions, and General Secretary of the Afghanistan Cricket Federation.

He was featured in Out of the Ashes, a documentary of the Afghanistan national cricket team's qualification for the 2010 ICC World Twenty20 tournament.

References

External links 
 

1975 births
Afghan cricketers
Living people
People from Nangarhar Province
Afghan cricket coaches
Coaches of the Afghanistan national cricket team